Shahrak-e Mustafa Khomeyni or Shahrak-e Mostafa Khomeyni may refer to:
 Shahrak-e Mustafa Khomeyni, Mazandaran
 Shahrak-e Mustafa Khomeyni, Tehran